Zahirabad-e Astaneh (also Romanized as Z̧ahīrābād-e Āstāneh; also known as Z̧ahīrābād, Zarābād, Zīrābād, Z̧ohrābād, and Z̧ohrābād-e Āstāneh) is a village in Astaneh Rural District, in the Central District of Shazand County, Markazi Province, Iran. At the 2006 census, its population was 1,001, in 203 families.

References 

Populated places in Shazand County